is a town located in Aso District, Kumamoto Prefecture, Japan.

As of October 1, 2016, the town has an estimated population of 6,189 and a density of 35 persons per km². The total area is 174.90 km².

Geography

Located at the easternmost point of Kumamoto Prefecture, it is located in the caldera of Mount Aso. It touches Ōita prefecture to the northeast and Miyazaki prefecture to the east. The town is divided into four areas, called Takamori, Shikimi, Kusakabe, and Nojiri. The city hall is situated in the Takamori area, where over half of the town population resides.
Mountains: Mount Aso, Nakadake, Nekodake, Takadake, Kishimadake, Eboshidake
Rivers: Shirakawa

Climate
Takamori has a humid subtropical climate (Köppen climate classification Cfa) with hot, humid summers and cool winters. There is significant precipitation throughout the year, especially during June and July.

Demographics
Per Japanese census data, the population of Takamori in 2020 is 5,789 people. Takamori has been conducting censuses since 1920.

Surrounding municipalities
Kumamoto Prefecture
Minamiaso
Aso
Yamato
Ōita Prefecture
Taketa
Miyazaki Prefecture
Takachiho

Education
High Schools
Takamori High School
Junior High Schools
Takamori Higashi Junior High School
Takamori Junior High School
Primary Schools
Takamori Higashi Elementary School
Takamori Chūō Elementary School

References

External links

Takamori official website 

Towns in Kumamoto Prefecture